Károly Zipernowsky (born as Carl Zipernowsky, 4 April 1853 in Vienna – 29 November 1942 in Budapest) was an Austrian-born Hungarian electrical engineer. He invented the transformer with his colleagues (Miksa Déri and Ottó Bláthy) at the famous Hungarian manufacturing company Ganz Works and he contributed significantly with his works also to other AC technologies.

Biography

Zipernowsky, with Ottó Bláthy and Miksa Déri, all of Ganz and Company, were researching ways of increasing efficiency of electrical power transmission. They experimented with power supplies and current transformation, which led to the invention of the ZBD alternating current transformer in 1885. The ZBD system is based on a closed-iron ring core with an arbitrary diameter and a coil around the core, which conducts AC current. Their system converted higher voltage suitable for energy transmission to lower "service"-level voltage (step-down transformer). Nikola Tesla then proposed the use of step-up transformers, which would output higher voltage than they received. This principle is widely used for power transmission over long distances all over the world.

References

External links 
 Technical University of Budapest.  "Károly Zipernowsky". Budapest, 1996.
  His life

¨

1853 births
1942 deaths
Hungarian inventors
Hungarian electrical engineers
Hungarian expatriates in Austria
Austro-Hungarian engineers
Austro-Hungarian inventors
Engineers from Vienna